Bansang is a town in the Central River Division of the Gambia, with a population of 8,843 (2012). Although the official government center of the Division is located in Janjanbureh downstream, Bansang has better access to the more affluent coastal region of the country, and is sometimes considered the unofficial "upcountry" economic capital.

The town is a market for peanuts, rice and fish.

Bansang is the location for the only government hospital in the interior regions of the country.

Gallery

Sources 
 The Atlas of the Gambia

References

Central River Division
Populated places in the Gambia